Aylworth is a village in Gloucestershire, England.

References

External links
 
 

Villages in Gloucestershire
Cotswold District